Mirabad (also Romanized as Mīrābād) is a city in, and the capital of, Vazineh District of Sardasht County, West Azerbaijan province, Iran. At the 2006 census, its population was 4,502 in 820 households. The following census in 2011 counted 5,430 people in 1,238 households. The latest census in 2016 showed a population of 6,000 people in 1,550 households.

References

Sardasht County

Populated places in Sardasht County

Populated places in West Azerbaijan Province

Cities in West Azerbaijan Province